The Clinical Data Interchange Standards Consortium (CDISC) is a standards developing organization (SDO) dealing with medical research data linked with healthcare, to "enable information system interoperability to improve medical research and related areas of healthcare". The standards support medical research from protocol through analysis and reporting of results and have been shown to decrease resources needed by 60% overall and 70–90% in the start-up stages when they are implemented at the beginning of the research process.

CDISC standards are harmonized through a model that is also a HL7 standard and is the process to becoming an ISO/CEN standard.

History
 Late 1997 – Started as a Volunteer group
 Summer 1998 – Invited to form DIA SIAC
 1999 – SDS v1.0; ODM v0.8
 2000 – SDS v1.1
 Feb 2000 – Formed an Independent, non-profit organization
 Dec 2001 – Global participation
 2001 – SDS v2.0; ODM v1.0
 2002 – ODM v1.1; ADaM v1.0
 2003 – LAB v1.0; SDTM v1/SDTM-IG v3.0;BRIDG Model Initiated; SEND 1.0
 2004 – LAB v1.1; ODM v1.2; SDTM v3.1
 2005 – Define.xml Implementation; Release (v1.0); SEND v.2; ODM v1.2.1; SDTM v1.1/SDTMIG v3.1.1; ODM mapped to HL7 RIM
 2006 – BRIDG v1.0, v1.1; BRIDG posted as open-source model
 2007 – ODM v1.3; LAB & SDTM Aligned;  BRIDG posted as open source model
 2008 – BRIDG v2.0, v2.1, v2.2; CDASH v1.0; eSDI document published 
 2009 – SDTM v1.2/SDTMIG 3.1.2; ADaM v2.1 and ADaMIG v1.0; Imaging CRFs; CDISC-IHE RFD and RPE
 2010 – Protocol Representation Model;(PRM) v1.0; BRIDG v3.0; ODM v1.3.1; HHS-ONC/HITSP Interoperability Specification #158; CDISC-IHE RPE
 2011 – CDASH v1.1; SEND v3.0; Study Design XML v1.0, ADaM Examples in Commonly Used Statistical Analysis Methods v1.0
 2012 – The ADaM Basic Data Structure for Time-to-Event Analyses v1.0, ADaM Data Structure for Adverse Event Analysis v1.0
 2013 – Define-XML Version 2.0, SDTM v1.4/SDTMIG v3.2
 2014 – SHARE R1
 2015 – ARM v1.0 extension for Define-XML Version 2
 2016 – DatasetXML, Therapeutic Areas, CTR-XML, ADaMIG v1.1, ADaM OCCDS v1.0

Overview of standards
 Dataset.XML (DataSet-XML)
 Enables communication of study results as well as regulatory submission to FDA (pilot since 2014).
 Study Data Tabulation Model (SDTM)
 Recommended for FDA regulatory submissions since 2004.
 The SDTM Implementation Guide (SDTM-IG) gives a standardized, predefined collection of domains for clinical data submission, each of which is based on the structure and metadata defined by the SDTM.
 Standard for Exchange of Non-clinical Data (SEND)
 The SEND Implementation Guide (SEND-IG) provides predefined domains and examples of non-clinical (animal) data based on the structure and metadata defined by the SDTM.
 Analysis Data Model (ADaM)
 Defines dataset and metadata standards that support statistical analyses and traceability. ADaM is one of the required standards for data submission to FDA (U.S.) and PMDA (Japan).
 Operational Data Model (ODM)
 The highlights of ODM: includes an audit trail, utilizes XML technology, machine- and human-readable, all information are independent of databases, storing of ODM is independent of hard- and software.
 Laboratory Data Model (LAB)
 The Lab standard is used for the exchange of laboratory data between labs and CROs
 Case Report Tabulation Data Definition Specification (CRT-DDS)
 Also referred to as "define.xml", a machine readable version of the regulatory submission "define.pdf".
 Clinical Data Acquisition Standards Harmonization (CDASH)
 Defines a minimal data collection set for sixteen safety SDTM Domains, harmonizing element names, definitions and metadata. The objective is to establish a standardized data collection baseline across all submissions.
 CDISC Terminology
 Defines controlled terminology for SDTM and CDASH, provides extensible lists of controlled terms designed to harmonize data collected across submissions.

Individual standards

Operational Data Model (ODM)
The CDISC Operational Data Model (ODM) is designed to facilitate the regulatory-compliant acquisition, archive and interchange of metadata and data for clinical research studies.  ODM is a vendor-neutral, platform-independent format for interchange and archive of clinical study data. The model includes the clinical data along with its associated metadata, administrative data, reference data and audit information. 
ODM was first introduced in 1999, and the latest version, 1.3.2, was released in 2012. ODM extensions have been developed to create a number of additional CDISC standards, including Define-XML, Dataset-XML, SDM-XML, and CTR-XML and future planned standard Protocol-XML.

ODM is an XML based standard and it is an XML schema that provides a number of constructs for modelling electronic Case Report Forms (CRFs). ODM is often combined with the Study Data Model standard to more fully model trial arms or trial activities. ODM is also used in sending forms data from a clinical trial system to an electronic health record (EHR) system.

The ODM schema is generally divided into three categories of data: Metadata, Admin data, and Clinical data. Metadata describes the structure of the eCRFs within the study, and how they relate to scheduled visits. Admin data contains references to users, locations, and any additional non-structural and non-clinical reference data. Clinical data contains all eCRF item values and references both Metadata and Admin data.

Define-XML
Define-XML supports the interchange of dataset metadata for clinical research applications in a machine-readable format. An important use case for Define-XML is to support the submission of clinical trials data in CDISC SDTM, SEND or ADaM format to regulatory authorities. The key metadata components to support submissions are:
 Dataset definition
 Dataset variable definitions
 Controlled Terminology definitions
 Value list definitions
 Links to supporting documents
 Computational method definitions
 Comments definitions

Define-XML can also be used to describe proprietary, non-CDISC dataset structures. The Define-XML model is implemented using extensions to the CDISC Operational Data Model (ODM) XML schema. The current version is 2.0 published on the CDISC website.

CTR-XML
Clinical Trial Representation allows representing basic characteristics of a clinical trial, such as study sponsor, study name, size of the trial (number of participants). The standard was first introduced in 2016.

BRIDG

CDISC BRIDG model is a unifying model of the domain of clinical research and research studies. It defines basic elements such as investigator, subject, study, intervention. It is used to keep all standards consistent. It was first introduced in 2006 with version 2 released in 2008. It can be obtained as UML model as well as .OWL format.

SHARE

CDISC SHARE (Shared Health and Clinical Research Electronic Library) is a metadata repository that supports the development, governance, publishing, and consumption of CDISC standards in human and machine-readable formats. SHARE helps users find, understand, and use rich metadata (i.e., research concepts, data elements and attributes, the relationship among data elements, properties in a relationship, and controlled terminologies) relevant to clinical studies more efficiently and consistently. With all this information in a single repository, SHARE will improve integration and traceability of clinical data end-to-end, from protocol through analysis. SHARE will provide a collaborative standards development environment that will improve quality, integration, and consistency across CDISC standards.

CDISC-registered solutions providers
CDISC maintains a list of solutions providers, subject matter experts and consultants deemed to have sufficient knowledge and experience implementing the various CDISC standards.

ODM and EDC integration
Electronic data capture (EDC) systems can be certified as compliant with the Operational Data Model (ODM) by CDISC. There are two main types of integration, ODM Import and ODM Export.

ODM import
Full import allows importing of ODM-formatted clinical data (MetaData and Data).
MetaData only import allows only the importing of MetaData. This is useful for setting up the EDC system to capture data. Basically allows third party software to define the forms, variables etc. used in the EDC system. This provides an EDC vendor-neutral system for defining a study.

ODM export
The EDC system will generate ODM data files for further processing. For example, REDCap and REDCap Cloud data capture systems allow export of a study in ODM.

See also

 Clinical data acquisition
 Clinical data management system (CDMS)
 Clinical trial
 Data model
 Data warehouse
 DICOM
 Electronic Common Technical Document (eCTD)
 Electronic data capture
 Health Informatics Service Architecture (HISA)
 Health Level 7
 LOINC
 SDTM
 SEND
 SNOMED
 SNOMED CT

References

Further reading
 Vikash Jain and Sandra Minjoe (2014), "A Road Map to Successful CDISC ADaM Submission to FDA: Guidelines, Best  Practices & Case Studies",  PharmaSUG 2014 – Paper DS15
 Rebecca Daniels Kush (2003), eClinical Trials: Planning and Implementation, CenterWatch / Thomson Healthcare, 
 Kevin Lee (2014), "CDISC Electronic Submission", PharmaSUG 2014 – DS14
 A J de Montjoie (2009), 'Introducing the CDISC Standards: New Efficiencies for Medical Research', CDISC Publications
 Henry Winsor (2014), Good versus Better SDTM – Why "Good Enough" May No Longer Be Good  Enough When It Comes to SDTM, PharmaSUG 2014 – Paper IB06

External links
 

Clinical research
Clinical data management
Standards organizations in the United States
Industry-specific XML-based standards
Standards for electronic health records
Non-profit technology
Statistical data agreements
Medical and health organizations based in Texas
Organizations based in Austin, Texas